Castle Hill is an area and country estate in the community of Llanilar, Ceredigion, Wales, which is 70.2 miles (112.9 km) from Cardiff and 175.8 miles (282.9 km) from London. Castle Hill is represented in the Senedd by Elin Jones (Plaid Cymru) and is part of the Ceredigion constituency in the House of Commons.

References

See also
List of localities in Wales by population

Villages in Ceredigion